Ol' Wheeler is the second album by American country artist Wheeler Walker, Jr. Released on June 2, 2017, the album debuted at number 10 on the Billboard Top Country Albums chart, with 7,800 copies sold in its first week.  Prior to the album's release, crowd funding music site PledgeMusic removed the album's pre-sales and refunded fans due to obscenity complaints. Upset, Wheeler Walker, Jr. claimed censorship and angry fans responded by trolling a page promoting the band 311.

Track listing

Charts

References

2017 albums
Ben Hoffman albums
Albums produced by Dave Cobb